Antonio de Juanas (c. 1755 - after 1819) was a composer in Spain and Mexico. In 1780 he was maestro de capilla at Alcalá de Henares Cathedral, and at Mexico City Cathedral from 1790 till 1816. In 1815 he obtained permission to return to Spain, where he arrived in 1819.
His compositions in the music archive of Mexico City Cathedral contain ten a capella Masses, 18 Masses with instrumental accompaniment and over 200 other works.

Recordings
 Antonio Juanas: Premiere Recordings of Selected Choral Works; Collegium Mundi Novi, Variant 6, John Austin Clark. Conductor: R. Ryan Endris (Centaur/Naxos, 2018, CRC 3663)

References

1750s births
19th-century deaths
Year of death unknown